Scott Covered Bridge is a historic wooden covered bridge located at Center Township in Greene County, Pennsylvania. It crosses Ten Mile Creek. As of October 1978, it was one of nine historic covered bridges in Greene County.

It was listed on the National Register of Historic Places in 1979.

References 

Covered bridges on the National Register of Historic Places in Pennsylvania
Covered bridges in Greene County, Pennsylvania
Bridges completed in 1885
Wooden bridges in Pennsylvania
Bridges in Greene County, Pennsylvania
National Register of Historic Places in Greene County, Pennsylvania
Road bridges on the National Register of Historic Places in Pennsylvania
Queen post truss bridges in the United States